The Final Command is the second full-length album from the German heavy metal band Paragon, released in 1998.

Track listing
 "Feel the Knife" - 03:50
 "Under the Gun" - 04:24
 "Eternal Life" - 06:21
 "Ashes" - 07:46
 "Warriors of Ice" - 05:04
 "Fighting for the Earth" (Warrior cover) - 05:12
 "War Inside My Head" - 05:24
 "The Final Command" - 05:31
 "Eye for an Eye" - 05:32

Credits
 Andreas Babuschkin - Vocals
 Martin Christian - Guitar
 Claudius Cremer - Guitar
 Jan Bünning - Bass
 Markus Corby - Drums

1998 albums
Final Command, The